The twenty-sixth series of the British medical drama television series Casualty commenced airing in the United Kingdom on BBC One on 13 August 2011, one week after the end of the previous series. It is the first series in the history of the show to begin without a break from the previous series and the first to begin in August rather than the traditional September launch. This series featured forty-two episodes, which was five episodes less than the previous series. Series twenty-six was the first series to broadcast in high definition, with the first high definition episode broadcast from episode 17. The episode also saw the first episode to be filmed at the new set in Cardiff. The show saw its twenty-fifth anniversary in September 2011 and in March 2012, the show aired their first ever three-part story which centred on gang violence. The series concluded with a two-part riot storyline, entitled '#HolbyRiot', which aired on 21 and 22 July 2012. The series was originally planned to finish on 21 July, but due to a postponed episode on 30 June, the finale was moved to the following day.

This series welcomed Lloyd Asike (Michael Obiora), Adrian "Fletch" Fletcher (Alex Walkinshaw), Tom Kent (Oliver Coleman), Sam Nicholls (Charlotte Salt), and Scarlett Conway (Madeleine Mantock) - the latter of which left at the end of the series. The series also saw the departures of Ruth Winters (Georgia Taylor), Jay Faldren (Ben Turner) and Lenny Lyons (Steven Miller); and marked the first of three guest stints for Tamzin Bayle (Gemma Atkinson).

Production
Oliver Kent continued as Series Producer until Episode 14. From Episode 15, Nikki Wilson has taken over.

Cast

Overview 
Most of the cast from series 25 carried over to the new series. These were senior charge nurse Charlie Fairhead, played by Derek Thompson, consultants Nick Jordan, Zoe Hanna and Dylan Keogh (Michael French, Sunetra Sarker and William Beck), trust grade doctor Ruth Winters (Georgia Taylor), Core Training 2 doctor Lenny Lyons (Steven Miller), clinical nurse manager Tess Bateman (Suzanne Packer), staff nurses Jay Faldren and Linda Andrews (Ben Turner and Christine Tremarco), paramedics Kathleen "Dixie" Dixon and Jeff Collier (Jane Hazlegrove and Matt Bardock), porter Mackenzie "Big Mac" Chalker (Charles Dale) and receptionist Noel Garcia (Tony Marshall).

Series 26 saw the brief addition to the cast of Gemma Atkinson (formerly Lisa Hunter in Hollyoaks) and Dhaffer L'Abidine (previously Marcel Sabatier in Dream Team). as paramedics Tamzin Bayle and Omar Nasri; their characters were written out early in the series, but Atkinson made two further brief returns, one in series 27 and one that stretched from late series 28 until early series 29.

Michael Obiora and Madeleine Mantock joined the cast as newly qualified staff nurses Lloyd Asike and Scarlett Conway. Later in the series, Charlotte Salt joined the cast as Dr Sam Nicholls, an army medic who was later revealed to be married to consultant Dylan Keogh. Oliver Coleman joined the cast on 7 January 2012, the first episode filmed in Cardiff, playing paediatric specialty doctor Tom Kent. New staff nurse Adrian "Fletch" Fletcher (Alex Walkinshaw) joined the show on 7 July 2012.

Main characters 

Matt Bardock as Jeff Collier
William Beck as Dylan Keogh
Oliver Coleman as Tom Kent
Charles Dale as Big Mac
Michael French as Nick Jordan
Jane Hazlegrove as Kathleen "Dixie" Dixon
Madeleine Mantock as Scarlett Conway
Tony Marshall as Noel Garcia
Steven Miller as Lenny Lyons
Michael Obiora as Lloyd Asike
Suzanne Packer as Tess Bateman
Charlotte Salt as Sam Nicholls
Sunetra Sarker as Zoe Hanna
Georgia Taylor as Ruth Winters
Derek Thompson as Charlie Fairhead
Christine Tremarco as Linda Andrews
Ben Turner as Jay Faldren
Alex Walkinshaw as Adrian "Fletch" Fletcher

Recurring characters 

Devon Beigan as Britney Andrews
Kate McEvoy as Denise Andrews
Taylor Parry as Joe Andrews
Rachel Shelley as Yvonne Rippon

Guest characters 

Gemma Atkinson as Tamzin Bayle
Danny Dyer as Rossy
Dhaffer L'Abidine as Omar Nasri
Marshall Lancaster as Keith Parr
Michael Stevenson as Iain Dean
Azuka Oforka as Louise Tilney

Episodes

Notes

References
General

 Titles, credits, airdates and summaries: BBC One - Casualty, Series 26
 Airdates and summaries: 
 Viewing figures: 

Specific

External links
 Casualty series 26 at the Internet Movie Database

26
2011 British television seasons
2012 British television seasons